Jack's Reef is a hamlet in the Town of Van Buren, New York in Onondaga County, United States. It was developed around an inn where Old Route 31 (supplanted by modern NY Route 31) bent around a large oxbow in the Seneca River. Subsequently, a canal was cut approximately one mile to the north, which shortened the navigation route. Consequently, Jack's Reef lost virtually all commercial and much recreational traffic. The nearby Seneca River still attracted summer residents, however. Today year-round homes are being built nearby, as the hamlet is within commuting range of Syracuse.

See also 
 Jack's Reef pentagonal projectile point

References 

Syracuse metropolitan area
Hamlets in Onondaga County, New York
Hamlets in New York (state)